The 2007–08 All-Ireland Senior Club Football Championship was the 38th staging of the All-Ireland Senior Club Football Championship since its establishment by the Gaelic Athletic Association in 1970-71. The championship began on 14 October 2007 and ended on 17 March 2008.

Crossmaglen Rangers entered the championship as the defending champions, however, they were defeated by St. Vincent's in the All-Ireland semi-final.

On 17 March 2008, St. Vincent's won the championship following a 1-11 to 0-13 defeat of Nemo Rangers in the All-Ireland final at Croke Park. It was their second championship title overall and their first title since 1976.

Tomás Quinn of the St. Vincent's club was the championship's top scorer with 3-22.

Results

Connacht Senior Club Football Championship

Quarter-final

Semi-finals

Final

Leinster Senior Club Football Championship

First round

Quarter-finals

Semi-finals

Final

Munster Senior Club Football Championship

Quarter-finals

Semi-finals

Final

Ulster Senior Club Football Championship

Preliminary round

Quarter-finals

Semi-finals

Final

All-Ireland Senior Club Football Championship

Quarter-final

Semi-finals

Final

Championship statistics

Top scorers

Overall

In a single game

Miscellaneous

 Wexford champions Clongeen forfeited home advantage in their preliminary round tie with Moorefield in order to get the game brought forward by a week to facilitate star player Paddy Colfer’s stag party in Edinburgh.
 Wicklow champions Baltinglass did not compete this year due to the late finish of their county championships.
 The Leinster Club SFC quarter-finals brought a bizarre refereeing gaffe which brought a premature end to the match between St. Vincent's and Seneschalstown in Parnell Park. The Dublin champions equalized in the final minute of normal time, before referee Eugene Murtagh blew for full-time shortly afterwards although extra-time had been scheduled. Both teams left the field and the spectators departed, and though a prominent refereeing official attempted to signal the mistake to Murtagh, the message wasn’t delivered in time. With the other quarter-final clash of Moorefield and Dromard at St. Conleth's Park going to extra-time, the error was accentuated.
 After their Leinster Club SFC quarter-final second replay tie with Dromard, Moorefield were hit with three player bans and stripped of home advantage in their next two Leinster club matches for their part in a brawl which broke out on the pitch towards the end of their tie. The first of these two matches were against Tyrrellspass and the next was in 2010 against Portlaoise, the next time they qualified for the Leinster SFC.

References

External links

All-Ireland Senior Club Football Championship
All-Ireland Senior Club Football Championship
All-Ireland Senior Club Football Championship